"Love and Regret" is the fourth single from the album When the World Knows Your Name by Scottish rock band Deacon Blue. The song was released on 4 September 1989. The main B-side of the single is "Down in the Flood", while some versions of the single contain the additional B-side "Undeveloped Heart", which Ricky Ross later re-recorded as a solo artist. A limited-edition four-track live Extended play (EP) single was released on 10-inch vinyl and CD formats at the same time as the standard singles.

Track listings
All songs were written by Ricky Ross except where noted.

7-inch and cassette single 
 "Love and Regret" – 4:48
 "Down in the Flood" (Ross, Deacon Blue) – 4:05

12-inch single 
 "Love and Regret" (extended mix) – 9:55
 "Down in the Flood" (Minimal mix) (Ross, Deacon Blue) – 4:28
 "Undeveloped Heart" (Ross, James Prime) – 3:37

CD single 
 "Love and Regret" – 4:48
 "Down in the Flood" (extended mix) (Ross, Deacon Blue) – 4:13
 "Undeveloped Heart" (Ross, Prime) – 3:37
 "Love and Regret" (extended mix) – 7:18

10-inch and CD EP 
 "Love and Regret" / "It's All in the Game" (live) (Ross, Carl Sigman, Charles Dawes) – 6:58
 "Spanish Moon" (Lowell George) / "Down in the Flood" (live) – 5:05
 "Dark End of the Street" (live) – 2:08
 "When Will You (Make My Telephone Ring)" (live) – 5:28

The live EP tracks were recorded at the following places and dates:
 "Love and Regret" / "It's All in the Game": The Brighton Dome on 22 May 1989
 "Spanish Moon" / "Down in the Flood": The Marquee on 20 November 1986
 "Dark End of the Street" / "When Will You (Make My Telephone Ring)": The Venue, Dee Why, Sydney, Australia, on 18 July 1989

Charts

References

Deacon Blue songs
1989 singles
1989 songs
CBS Records singles
Songs written by Ricky Ross (musician)